The Christian Social Union in Bavaria (German: , CSU) is a Christian-democratic and conservative political party in Germany. Having a regionalist identity, the CSU operates only in Bavaria while its larger counterpart, the Christian Democratic Union (CDU), operates in the other fifteen states of Germany. It differs from the CDU by being somewhat more conservative in social matters, following Catholic social teaching. The CSU is considered the de facto successor of the Weimar-era Catholic Bavarian People's Party.

At the federal level, the CSU forms a common faction in the Bundestag with the CDU which is frequently referred to as the Union Faction (die Unionsfraktion) or simply CDU/CSU. The CSU has 45 seats in the Bundestag since the 2021 federal election, making it currently the second smallest of the seven parties represented. The CSU is a member of the European People's Party and the International Democrat Union.

Party leader Markus Söder serves as Minister-President of Bavaria, a position that CSU representatives have held from 1946 to 1954 and again since 1957.

History 

Franz Josef Strauß (1915–1988) had left behind the strongest legacy as a leader of the party, having led the party from 1961 until his death in 1988. His political career in the federal cabinet was unique in that he had served four ministerial posts in the years between 1953 and 1969. From 1978 until his death in 1988, Strauß served as the Minister-President of Bavaria. Strauß was the first leader of the CSU to be a candidate for the German chancellery in 1980. In the 1980 federal election, Strauß ran against the incumbent Helmut Schmidt of the Social Democratic Party of Germany (SPD) but lost thereafter as the SPD and the Free Democratic Party (FDP) managed to secure an absolute majority together, forming a social-liberal coalition.

The CSU has led the Bavarian state government since it came into existence in 1946, save from 1954 to 1957 when the SPD formed a state government in coalition with the Bavaria Party and the state branches of the GB/BHE and FDP.

Initially, the separatist Bavaria Party (BP) successfully competed for the same electorate as the CSU, as both parties saw and presented themselves as successors to the BVP. The CSU was ultimately able to win this power struggle for itself. Among other things, the BP was involved in the "casino affair" under dubious circumstances by the CSU at the end of the 1950s and lost considerable prestige and votes. In the 1966 state election, the BP finally left the state parliament.

Before the 2008 elections in Bavaria, the CSU perennially achieved absolute majorities at the state level by itself. This level of dominance is unique among Germany's 16 states. Edmund Stoiber took over the CSU leadership in 1999. He ran for Chancellor of Germany in 2002, but his preferred CDU/CSU–FDP coalition lost against the SPD candidate Gerhard Schröder's SPD–Green alliance.

In the 2003 Bavarian state election, the CSU won 60.7% of the vote and 124 of 180 seats in the state parliament. This was the first time any party had won a two-thirds majority in a German state parliament. The Economist later suggested that this exceptional result was due to a backlash against Schröder's government in Berlin. The CSU's popularity declined in subsequent years. Stoiber stepped down from the posts of Minister-President and CSU chairman in September 2007. A year later, the CSU lost its majority in the 2008 Bavarian state election, with its vote share dropping from 60.7% to 43.4%. The CSU remained in power by forming a coalition with the FDP. In the 2009 general election, the CSU received only 42.5% of the vote in Bavaria in the 2009 election, which by then constituted its weakest showing in the party's history.

The CSU made gains in the 2013 Bavarian state election and the 2013 federal election, which were held a week apart in September 2013. The CSU regained their majority in the Bavarian Landtag and remained in government in Berlin. They had three ministers in the Fourth Merkel cabinet, namely Horst Seehofer (Minister of the Interior, Building and Community), Andreas Scheuer (Minister of Transport and Digital Infrastructure) and Gerd Müller (Minister for Economic Cooperation and Development).

The 2018 Bavarian state election yielded the worst result for the CSU in the state elections (top candidate Markus Söder) since 1950 with 37.2% of votes, a decline of over ten percentage points compared to the last result in 2013. After that, the CSU had to form a new coalition government with the minor partner Free Voters of Bavaria.

The 2021 German federal election saw the worst election result ever for the Union. The CSU also had a weak showing with 5.2% of votes nationally and 31.7% of the total in Bavaria.

Relationship with the CDU 

The CSU is the sister party of the Christian Democratic Union (CDU). Together, they are called the Union. The CSU operates only within Bavaria, and the CDU operates in all states other than Bavaria. While virtually independent, at the federal level the parties form a common CDU/CSU faction. No Chancellor has ever come from the CSU, although Strauß and Edmund Stoiber were CDU/CSU candidates for Chancellor in the 1980 federal election and the 2002 federal election, respectively, which were both won by the Social Democratic Party of Germany (SPD). Below the federal level, the parties are entirely independent.

Since its formation, the CSU has been more conservative than the CDU. CSU and the state of Bavaria decided not to sign the Grundgesetz of the Federal Republic of Germany as they could not agree with the division of Germany into two states after World War II. Although Bavaria like all German states has a separate police and justice system (distinctive and non-federal), the CSU has actively participated in all political affairs of the German Parliament, the German government, the German Bundesrat, the parliamentary elections of the German President, the European Parliament and meetings with Mikhail Gorbachev in Russia.

Like the CDU, the CSU is pro-European, although some Eurosceptic tendencies were shown in the past.

Leaders

Party chairmen

Ministers-president 
The CSU has contributed eleven of the twelve Ministers-President of Bavaria since 1945, with only Wilhelm Hoegner (1945–1946, 1954–1957) of the SPD also holding the office.

Election results

Federal parliament (Bundestag)

European Parliament

Landtag of Bavaria

See also 

 List of Christian Social Union of Bavaria politicians
 Politics of Germany

Notes and references

Further reading 
 Alf Mintzel (1975). Die CSU. Anatomie einer konservativen Partei 1945–1972 . Opladen. .

External links
Christlich-Soziale Union – official website (English page)
Christian-Social Union (Bavaria, Germany)
Christian-Social Union of Bavaria (CSU)

1945 establishments in Germany
Bavarian nationalism
Catholic political parties
Centre-right parties in Europe
Christian democratic parties in Germany
Conservative parties in Germany
International Democrat Union member parties
Member parties of the European People's Party
Parties represented in the European Parliament
Political parties established in 1945
Politics of Bavaria
Pro-European political parties in Germany
Regional parties in Germany
Social conservative parties